In molecular biology this protein domain, refers to UbiD, which is found in prokaryotes, archaea and fungi, with two members in Archaeoglobus fulgidus. They are related to UbiD, a 3-octaprenyl-4-hydroxybenzoate carboxy-lyase from Escherichia coli that is involved in ubiquinone biosynthesis. The member from Helicobacter pylori has a C-terminal extension of just over 100 residues that is shared, in part, by the Aquifex aeolicus homologue.

Function
Ubiquinone is an essential electron carrier in prokaryotes. In Escherichia coli, the Ubiquinone biosynthesis pathway involves at least nine reactions whereby 3-octaprenyl4-hydroxybenzoate
decarboxylase (UbiD) is an enzyme on the pathway which catalyses the conversion of  the substrate 3-octaprenyl-4-hydroxybenzoate to  the product, 2-octaprenyl phenol. E. coli ubiD- mutants have defects in Q8 biosynthesis, accumulate 4-hydroxy-3-octaprenylbenzoicacid (HP8B), and lack decarboxylase activity in vitro. However, E. coli ubiD- mutants retained the ability to produce about 20–25% of the normal levels of Q 4-hydroxy-3-octaprenylbenzoic acid. In essence, the protein domain, UbiD, is vital to creating ubiquinone, an essential electron carrier in the creation on energy.

References

Protein families